Anton Grundel (born March 5, 1990) is a Swedish former professional ice hockey defenceman who played most notably for Färjestad BK of the Swedish Hockey League (SHL).

He spent the entirety of his junior and professional career within the Färjestad BK organization, except for the 2015–16 season, playing with newly the promoted Karlskrona HK. During the 2018-19 season, unable to play due to lingering concussion issues, Grundel was forced to retire from professional hockey, announcing on 27 February 2019.

Awards and honours

References

External links

1990 births
Living people
Färjestad BK players
Karlskrona HK players
Swedish ice hockey defencemen
Sportspeople from Karlstad